In archaeogenetics, the term Western Steppe Herders (WSH), or Western Steppe Pastoralists, is the name given to a distinct ancestral component first identified in individuals from the Eneolithic steppe around the turn of the 5th millennium BC, subsequently detected in several genetically similar or directly related ancient populations including the Khvalynsk, Sredny Stog, and Yamnaya cultures, and found in substantial levels in contemporary European, West Asian and South Asian populations. This ancestry is often referred to as Yamnaya Ancestry, Yamnaya-Related Ancestry, Steppe Ancestry or Steppe-Related Ancestry.

Western Steppe Herders are considered descended from Eastern Hunter-Gatherers (EHGs) who reproduced with Caucasus Hunter-Gatherers (CHGs), and the WSH component is analysed as an admixture of EHG and CHG ancestral components in roughly equal proportions, with the majority of the Y-DNA haplogroup contribution from EHG males. The Y-DNA haplogroups of Western Steppe Herder males are not uniform, with the Yamnaya culture individuals mainly belonging to R1b-Z2103 with a minority of I2a2, the earlier Khvalynsk culture also with mainly R1b but also some R1a, Q1a, J, and I2a2, and the later, high WSH ancestry Corded Ware culture individuals mainly belonging to haplogroup R1b in the earliest samples, with R1a-M417 becoming predominant over time.

Around 3,000 BC, people of the Yamnaya culture or a closely related group, who had high levels of WSH ancestry with some additional Neolithic farmer admixture, embarked on a massive expansion throughout Eurasia, which is considered to be associated with the dispersal of at least some of the Indo-European languages by most contemporary linguists, archaeologists, and geneticists. WSH ancestry from this period is often referred to as Steppe Early and Middle Bronze Age (Steppe EMBA) ancestry.

This migration is linked to the origin of both the Corded Ware culture, whose members were of about 75% WSH ancestry, and the Bell Beaker ("Eastern group"), who were around 50% WSH ancestry, though the exact relationships between these groups remains uncertain. 

The expansion of WSHs resulted in the virtual disappearance of the Y-DNA of Early European Farmers (EEFs) from the European gene pool, significantly altering the cultural and genetic landscape of Europe. During the Bronze Age, Corded Ware people with admixture from Central Europe remigrated onto the steppe, forming the Sintashta culture and a type of WSH ancestry often referred to as Steppe Middle and Late Bronze Age (Steppe MLBA) or Sintashta-Related ancestry. 

Through the Andronovo culture and Srubnaya culture, Steppe MLBA was carried into Central Asia and South Asia along with Indo-Iranian languages, leaving a long-lasting cultural and genetic legacy.

The modern population of Europe can largely be modeled as a mixture of WHG (Western Hunter-Gatherer), EEF and WSH.

Summary 

A summary of several genetic studies published in Nature and Cell during the year 2015 is given by :
 Western Steppe Herders component "is lower in southern Europe and higher in northern Europe", where inhabitants have roughly 50% WSH ancestry on average.
 It is linked to the migrations of Yamnaya populations dated to ca. 3000 BC;
 Third-millennium Europe (and prehistoric Europe in general) was "a highly dynamic period involving large-scale population migrations and replacement";
 The Yamnaya migrations are linked to the spread of Indo-European languages;
 The plague (Yersinia pestis) killed prehistoric humans in Europe during the third millennium BC, and it stemmed from the Eurasian steppes;
 Yamnaya peoples have the highest ever calculated genetic selection for stature;

Nomenclature and definition 
'Steppe ancestry' can be classified into at least three distinctive clusters. In its simplest and earliest form, it can be modelled as an admixture of two highly divergent ancestral components; a population related to Eastern Hunter-Gatherers (EHG) as the original inhabitants of the European steppe in the Mesolithic, and a population related to Caucasus Hunter-Gatherers (CHG) that had spread northwards from the Near East. This ancestry profile is known as 'Eneolithic Steppe' ancestry, or 'pre-Yamnaya ancestry', and is represented by ancient individuals from the Khvalynsk II and Progress 2 archaeological sites. These individuals are chronologically intermediate between EHGs and the later Yamnaya population, and harbour very variable proportions of CHG ancestry.

The later Yamnaya population can be modelled as an admixed EHG-related/CHG-related population with additional (c. 14%) Anatolian Farmer ancestry with some Western Hunter-Gatherer admixture, or alternatively can be modelled as a mixture of EHG, CHG, and Iranian Chalcolithic ancestries. This ancestry profile is not found in the earlier Eneolithic steppe or Steppe Maykop populations. In addition to individuals of the Yamnaya culture, very similar ancestry is also found in individuals of the closely related Afanasievo culture near the Altai Mountains and the Poltavka culture on the Middle Bronze Age steppe. This genetic component is known as Steppe Early to Middle Bronze Age (Steppe EMBA), or Yamnaya-related ancestry.

Expansions of Yamnaya-related populations to Eastern and Central Europe resulted in the formation of populations with admixed EMBA Steppe and Early European Farmer ancestry, such as the ancient individuals of the Corded Ware and Bell beaker cultures. In the eastern Corded Ware culture, the Fatyanovo-Balanovo group may have been the source of a back migration onto the steppe and further to the east, resulting in the formation of the Srubnaya, Sintashta, and Andronovo cultures. The genetic cluster represented by ancient individuals from these cultures is known as Steppe Middle to Late Bronze Age (Steppe MLBA) ancestry.

Origins and expansion

Steppe Eneolithic 

The precise location of the initial formation of so-called 'Eneolithic steppe' ancestry, which can be modeled as a relatively simple admixture of EHG and Near Eastern (CHG-related) populations, remains uncertain. Admixture between populations with Near Eastern ancestry and the EHG on the Pontic-Caspian steppe had begun by the fifth millennium BC, predating the Yamnaya culture by at least 1,000 years. 

This early, 'pre-Yamnaya' ancestry was first detected in Eneolithic individuals at the Khvalynsk II cemetery and directly north of the Caucasus mountains at the Progress 2 archaeological site; this ancestry is also detected in individuals of the Steppe Maykop culture, but with additional Siberian and Native American-related admixture. 

The individuals from Khvalynsk comprise a genetically heterogeneous population, with some more similar to EHGs and others closer to the later Yamnaya population. On average, these individuals can be modelled as around three-quarters EHG and one-quarter Near Eastern ("Armenian related") ancestry. These three individuals belong to Y-chromosome haplogroups R1a (which is not found in later elite Yamnaya graves), R1b, and Q1a, the first two of which are found in preceding EHG populations, which suggests continuity with the preceding EHG population. 

Three individuals from the Progress 2 site in the foothills north of the Caucasus also harbour EHG and CHG related ancestry, and are genetically similar to Eneolithic individuals from Khvalynsk II but with higher levels of CHG-related ancestry that are comparable to the later Yamnaya population.

Archaeologist David Anthony speculates that the Khvalynsk/Progress-2 mating network, located between the middle Volga and the North Caucasus foothills, makes a "plausible genetic ancestor for Yamnaya".

Steppe Early to Middle Bronze Age

Early Yamnaya individuals, the Afanasievo population, and the individuals of the Poltavka and Catacomb cultures that followed the Yamnaya on the steppe comprise a genetically almost indistinguishable cluster, carrying predominantly R1b Y-DNA haplogroups with a minority of I2a.

When the first Yamnaya whole genome sequences were published in 2015, Yamnaya individuals were reported to have no Anatolian Farmer ancestry, but following larger studies it is now generally agreed that Yamnaya had around 14% Anatolian Farmer ancestry, with an additional small WHG component, which was not present in the previous Eneolithic steppe individuals.

The actual populations involved in the formation of the Yamnaya cluster remain uncertain. Proposed models have included admixture of an EHG/CHG population with European Farmers to the west (such as those of the Globular Amphorae culture or a genetically similar population), a two-way admixture of EHGs with an Iran Chalcolithic population, and a three-way admixture of EHG, CHG, and Iran Chalcolithic populations. 

A 2022 study concludes that Yamnaya ancestry can be modelled as a mixture of an as yet unsampled  admixed EHG/CHG population with a second source from the south Caucasus, and rejects Khvalynsk Eneolithic as a source population for the Yamnaya cluster. The study also contradicts suggestions that European farmer populations of the Cucuteni-Trypillia and Globular Amphora cultures contributed ancestry to Yamnaya, as Yamnaya lack the additional hunter-gatherer ancestry found in European farmers, and carry equal proportions of Anatolian and Levantine ancestry, unlike European farmers who carry predominantly Anatolian ancestry.

Corded Ware and Bell Beaker

Genetic evidence demonstrates a major and relatively sudden population turnover in Europe during the early third millennium BC, resulting in the rapid spread of steppe ancestry along with the Corded Ware and Bell Beaker cultures.

Corded Ware individuals have been shown to be genetically distinct from preceding European Neolithic cultures of North-Central and Northeastern Europe, with around 75% of their ancestry derived from a Yamnaya-like population. 

The earliest Corded Ware individuals are genetically close to Yamnaya. Admixture with local Neolithic populations resulted in later individuals genetically intermediate between Yamnaya and individuals of the Globular Amphora Culture. 

A 2021 study suggests that Early Corded Ware from Bohemia can be modelled as a three way mixture of Yamnaya-like and European Neolithic-like populations, with an additional c. 5 % to 15 % contribution from a northeast European Eneolithic forest-steppe group (such as Pitted Ware, Latvia Middle Neolithic, Ukraine Neolithic, or a genetically similar population), a cluster the authors term 'Forest Steppe' ancestry.

In the Bell Beaker culture, high proportions (c. 50%) of steppe related ancestry are found in individuals from Germany, the Czech Republic, and Britain. The genetic turnover is most substantial in Britain, where around 90% of the gene pool was replaced within a few hundred years. 

The earliest Bell Beaker individuals from Bohemia harbouring Steppe ancestry are genetically similar to Corded Ware individuals, which suggests continuity between these two groups. Later Bell Beaker individuals have an additional c. 20% Middle Eneolithic ancestry.

Steppe Middle to Late Bronze Age

Bronze Age individuals from the Sintashta culture in the southern Urals and the closely related Andronovo culture in Central Asia, as well as the Srubnaya culture on the Pontic Caspian steppe, all carry substantial levels of Yamnaya-related ancestry, with additional European Farmer admixture, an ancestry known as Steppe Middle to Late Bronze Age ancestry (Steppe MLBA), which developed with the formation of the Corded Ware culture who may also be included in this cluster. Individuals from the Sintashta, Andronovo, and Srubnaya cultures are all genetically similar and may ultimately descend from a secondary migration of the  Fatyanovo population, an eastern Corded Ware group.

This Steppe MLBA cluster may be further divided into a 'Western Steppe MLBA cluster', who may be modelled as around two thirds Yamnaya-related ancestry and one third European Farmer ancestry, and a 'Central Steppe MLBA cluster', which can be modelled as Western MLBA with around 9% West Siberian Hunter Gatherer (WSHG) ancestry. It has been suggested that the Central Steppe LMBA cluster was the main vector for the spread of Yamnaya-related ancestry to South Asia in the early 2nd millennium BC.

Studies

Haak et al (2015), Massive migration from the steppe was a source for Indo-European languages in Europe 
 found the ancestry of the people of the Yamnaya culture to be a mix of Eastern Hunter-Gatherer and another unidentified population. All seven Yamnaya males surveyed were found to belong to subclade R-M269 of haplogroup R1b. R1b had earlier been detected among EHGs living further north.

The study found that the tested individuals of the Corded Ware culture were of approximately 75% WSH ancestry, being descended from Yamnaya or a genetically similar population who had mixed with Middle Neolithic Europeans. This suggested that the Yamnaya people or a closely related group embarked on a massive expansion ca. 3,000 BC, which probably played a role in the dispersal of at least some of the Indo-European languages in Europe. 

At this time, Y-DNA haplogroups common among Early European Farmers (EEFs), such as G2a, disappear almost entirely in Central Europe, and are replaced by WSH/EHG paternal haplogroups which were previously rare (R1b) or unknown (R1a) in this region. EEF mtDNA decreases significantly as well, and is replaced by WSH types, suggesting that the Yamnaya expansion was carried out by both males and females.

In the aftermath of the Yamnaya expansion there appears to have been a resurgence of EEF and Western Hunter-Gatherer (WHG) ancestry in Central Europe, as this is detected in samples from the Bell Beaker culture and its successor the Unetice culture. The Bell Beaker culture had about 50% WSH ancestry.

All modern European populations can be modeled as a mixture of WHG, EEF and WSH. WSH ancestry is more common in Northern Europe than Southern Europe. Of modern populations surveyed in the study, Norwegians were found to have the largest amount of WSH ancestry, which among them exceeded 50%.

Allentoft et al. (2015), Population genomics of Bronze Age Eurasia
 examined the Y-DNA of five Yamnaya males. Four belonged to types of R1b1a2, while one belonged to I2a2a1b1b. The study found that the Neolithic farmers of Central Europe had been "largely replaced" by Yamnaya people around 3,000 BC. This replacement altered not only the genetic landscape, but also the cultural landscape of Europe in many respects.

It was discovered that the people of the contemporary Afanasievo culture of southern Siberia were "genetically indistinguishable" from the Yamnaya. People of the Corded Ware culture, the Bell Beaker culture, the Unetice culture and the Nordic Bronze Age were found to be genetically very similar to one another, but also with varying levels of affinity to Yamnaya, the highest found in Corded Ware individuals. The authors of the study suggested that the Sintashta culture of Central Asia emerged as a result of an eastward migration from Central Europe of Corded Ware people with both WSH and European Neolithic farmer ancestry.

Jones et al. (2015), Upper Palaeolithic genomes reveal deep roots of modern Eurasians
 found that the WSHs were descended from admixture between EHGs and a previously unknown clade which the authors identify and name Caucasus hunter-gatherers (CHGs). CHGs were found to have split off from WHGs ca. 43,000 BC, and to have split off from EEFs ca. 23,000 BC. It was estimated that Yamnaya "owe half of their ancestry to CHG-linked sources."

Mathieson et al. (2015), Genome-wide patterns of selection in 230 ancient Eurasians
, Genome-wide patterns of selection in 230 ancient Eurasians, published in Nature in November 2015 found that the people of the Poltavka culture, Potapovka culture and Srubnaya culture were closely related and largely of WSH descent, although the Srubnaya carried more EEF ancestry (about 17%) than the rest. Like in Yamnaya, males of Poltavka mostly carried types of R1b, while Srubnaya males carried types of R1a.

The study found that most modern Europeans could be modelled as a mixture between WHG, EEF and WSH.

Lazaridis et al. (2016): Genomic insights into the origin of farming in the ancient Near East
A genetic study published in Nature in July 2016 found that WSHs were a mixture of EHGs and "a population related to people of the Iran Chalcolithic". EHGs were modeled as being of 75% Ancient North Eurasian (ANE) descent. A significant presence of WSH ancestry among populations of South Asia was detected. Here WSH ancestry peaked at 50% among the Kalash people, which is a level similar to modern populations of Northern Europe.

Lazaridis et al. (2017), Genetic Origins of the Minoans and Mycenaeans
 examined the genetic origins of the Mycenaeans and the Minoans. Although they were found to be genetically similar to Minoans, the Mycenaeans were found to harbor about 15% WSH ancestry, which was not present in Minoans. It was found that Mycenaeans could be modelled as a mixture of WSH and Minoan ancestry. The study asserts that there are two key questions remaining to be addressed by future studies. 

First, when did the common "eastern" ancestry of both Minoans and Mycenaeans arrive in the Aegean? Second, is the "northern" ancestry in Mycenaeans due to sporadic infiltration of Greece, or the result of a rapid migration as in Central Europe? Such a migration would support the idea that proto-Greek speakers formed the southern wing of a steppe intrusion of Indo-European speakers. Yet, the absence of "northern" ancestry in the Bronze Age samples from Pisidia, where Indo-European languages were attested in antiquity, casts doubt on this genetic-linguistic association, with further sampling of ancient Anatolian speakers needed.

The Beaker phenomenon and the genomic transformation of northwest Europe
Olalde et al. (2018) examined the entry of WSH ancestry into the British Isles. WSH ancestry was found to have been carried into the British Isles by the Bell Beaker culture in the second half of the 3rd millennium BC. The migrations of Bell Beakers were accompanied with "a replacement of ~90% of Britain's gene pool within a few hundred years". The gene pool in the British Isles had previously been dominated by EEFs, with additional WHG admixture that varied regionally.

Y-DNA in parts of the modern British Isles belongs almost entirely to R1b-M269, a WSH lineage, which is thought to have been brought to the isles with Bell Beakers.

The Genomic History of Southeastern Europe
A genetic study published in Nature in February 2018 noted that the modern population of Europe can largely be modeled as a mixture between EHG, WHG, WSH and EEF.

The study examined individuals from the Globular Amphora culture, who bordered the Yamnaya. Globular Amphora culture people were found to have no WSH ancestry, suggesting that cultural differences and genetic differences were connected.

Notably, WSH ancestry was detected among two individuals buried in modern-day Bulgaria ca. 4,500 BC. This showed that WSH ancestry appeared outside of the steppe 2,000 years earlier than previously believed.

The First Horse Herders and the Impact of Early Bronze Age Steppe Expansions into Asia
 found that Yamnaya-related migrations had a lower direct and long-lasting impact in East and South Asia than in Europe. Crucially, the Botai culture of Late Neolithic Central Asia was found to have no WSH ancestry, suggesting that they belonged to an ANE-derived population deeply diverged from the WSHs.

Bronze Age population dynamics and the rise of dairy pastoralism on the eastern Eurasian steppe
A genetic study published in the Proceedings of the National Academy of Sciences of the United States of America in November 2018 examined the presence of WSH ancestry in the Mongolian Plateau. A number of remains from Late Bronze Age individuals buried around Lake Baikal were studied. These individuals had only 7% WSH ancestry, suggesting that pastoralism was adopted on the Eastern Steppe through cultural transmission rather than genetic displacement.

The study found that WSH ancestry found among Late Bronze Age populations of the south Siberia such as the Karasuk culture was transmitted through the Andronovo culture rather than the earlier Afanasievo culture, whose genetic legacy in the region by this time was virtually non-existent.

Wang (2019), Ancient Human Genome-Wide Data From a 3000-Year Interval in the Caucasus Corresponds with Eco-Geographic Regions
A genetic study published in Nature Communications in February 2019 compared the genetic origins of the Yamnaya culture and the Maikop culture. It found that most of the EEF ancestry found among the Yamnaya culture was derived from the Globular Amphora culture and the Cucuteni–Trypillia culture of Eastern Europe. Total EEF ancestry among the Yamnaya has been estimated at 10-18%. Given the high amount of EEF ancestry in the Maikop culture, this makes it impossible for the Maikop culture to have been a major source of CHG ancestry among the WSHs. Admixture from the CHGs into the WSHs must thus have happened at an earlier date.

The genomic history of the Iberian Peninsula over the past 8000 years
Olalde et al. (2019) analyzed the process by which WSH ancestry entered the Iberian Peninsula. The earliest evidence of WSH ancestry there was found from an individual living in Iberia in 2,200 BC in close proximity with native populations. By 2,000 BC, the native Y-DNA of Iberia (H, G2 and I2) had been almost entirely replaced with a single WSH lineage, R-M269. mtDNA in Iberia at this time was however still mostly of native origin, affirming that the entry of WSH ancestry in Iberia was primarily male-driven.

Narasimhan et al. (2019), The Genomic Formation of South and Central Asia

, The Genomic Formation of South and Central Asia, published in Science in September 2019, found a large amount of WSH ancestry among Indo-European-speaking populations throughout Eurasia. This lent support to the theory that the Yamnaya people were Indo-European-speaking.

The study found people of the Corded Ware, Srubnaya, Sintashta and Andronovo cultures to be a closely related group with around two-thirds WSH ancestry, and around one-third European Middle Neolithic admixture. These results further underpinned the notion that the Sintashta culture emerged as an eastward migration of Corded Ware peoples with mostly WSH ancestry back into the steppe. Among early WSHs, R1b is the most common Y-DNA lineage, while R1a (particularly R1a1a1b2) is common among later groups of Central Asia, such as Andronovo and Srubnaya.

West Siberian Hunter-Gatherers (WSGs), a distinct archaeogenetic lineage, was discovered in the study. These were found to be of about 30% EHG ancestry, 50% ANE ancestry, and 20% East Asian ancestry. It was noticed that WSHs during their expansion towards the east gained a slight (ca. 8%) admixture from WSGs.

It was found that there was a significant infusion of WSH ancestry into Central Asia and South Asia during the Bronze Age. WSH ancestry was found to have been almost completely absent from earlier samples in southern Central Asia in the 3rd millennium BC.

During the expansion of WSHs from Central Asia towards South Asia in the Bronze Age, an increase in South Asian agriculturalist ancestry among WSHs was noticed. Among South Asian populations, WSH ancestry is particularly high among Brahmins and Bhumihars. WSH ancestry was thus expected to have spread into India with the Vedic culture.

Antonio et al.(2019), Ancient Rome: A genetic crossroads of Europe and the Mediterranean
, Ancient Rome: A genetic crossroads of Europe and the Mediterranean, published in Science in November 2019 examined the remains of six Latin males buried near Rome between 900 BC and 200 BC. They carried the paternal haplogroups R-M269, T-L208, R-311, R-PF7589 and R-P312 (two samples), and the maternal haplogroups H1aj1a, T2c1f, H2a, U4a1a, H11a and H10. A female from the preceding Proto-Villanovan culture carried the maternal haplogroups U5a2b. These examined individuals were distinguished from preceding populations of Italy by the presence of ca. 30-40% steppe ancestry. Genetic differences between the examined Latins and the Etruscans were found to be insignificant.

Fernandes et al. (2019), The Arrival of Steppe and Iranian Related Ancestry in the Islands of the Western Mediterranean
, The Arrival of Steppe and Iranian Related Ancestry in the Islands of the Western Mediterranean, found that a skeleton excavated from the Balearic islands (dating to ∼2400 BC) had substantial WSH ancestry; however, later Balearic individuals had less Steppe heritage reflecting geographic heterogeneity or immigration from groups with more European first farmer-related ancestry. In Sicily, WSH ancestry arrived by ∼2200 BC and likely came at least in part from Spain. 4 of the 5 Early Bronze Age Sicilian males had Steppe-associated Y-haplogroup R1b1a1a2a1a2 (R-P312). Two of these were Y-haplogroup R1b1a1a2a1a2a1 (Z195) which today is largely restricted to Iberia and has been hypothesized to have originated there 2500-2000 BC. In Sardinia, no convincing evidence of WSH ancestry in the Bronze Age has been found, but the authors detect it by ∼200-700 CE.

Analysis

The American archaeologist David W. Anthony (2019) summarized the recent genetic data on WSHs. Anthony notes that WSHs display genetic continuity between the paternal lineages of the Dnieper-Donets culture and the Yamnaya culture, as the males of both cultures have been found to have been mostly carriers of R1b, and to a lesser extent I2.

While the mtDNA of the Dnieper-Donets people is exclusively types of U, which is associated with EHGs and WHGs, the mtDNA of the Yamnaya also includes types frequent among CHGs and EEFs. Anthony notes that WSH had earlier been found among the Sredny Stog culture and the Khvalynsk culture, who preceded the Yamnaya culture on the Pontic–Caspian steppe. The Sredny Stog were mostly WSH with slight EEF admixture, while the Khvalynsk living further east were purely WSH. Anthony also notes that unlike their Khvalynsk predecessors, the Y-DNA of the Yamnaya is exclusively EHG and WHG. This implies that the leading clans of the Yamnaya were of EHG and WHG origin. 

Because the slight EEF ancestry of the WSHs has been found to be derived from Central Europe, and because there is no CHG Y-DNA detected among the Yamnaya, Anthony notes that it is impossible for the Maikop culture to have contributed much to the culture or CHG ancestry of the WSHs. Anthony suggests that admixture between EHGs and CHGs first occurred on the eastern Pontic-Caspian steppe around 5,000 BC, while admixture with EEFs happened in the southern parts of the Pontic-Caspian steppe sometime later.

As Yamnaya Y-DNA is exclusively of the EHG and WHG type, Anthony notes that the admixture must have occurred between EHG and WHG males, and CHG and EEF females. Anthony cites this as additional evidence that the Indo-European languages were initially spoken among EHGs living in Eastern Europe. On this basis, Anthony concludes that the Indo-European languages which the WSHs brought with them were initially the result of "a dominant language spoken by EHGs that absorbed Caucasus-like elements in phonology, morphology, and lexicon" (spoken by CHGs).

During the Chalcolithic and early Bronze Age, the Early European Farmer (EEF) cultures of Europe were overwhelmed by successive invasions of WSHs. These invasions led to EEF paternal DNA lineages in Europe being almost entirely replaced with EHG/WSH paternal DNA (mainly R1b and R1a). EEF mtDNA however remained frequent, suggesting admixture between WSH males and EEF females.

Phenotypes 
Western Steppe Herders are believed to have been light-skinned. Early Bronze Age Steppe populations such as the Yamnaya are believed to have had mostly brown eyes and dark hair, while the people of the Corded Ware culture had a higher proportion of blue eyes.

The rs12821256 allele of the KITLG gene that controls melanocyte development and melanin synthesis, which is associated with blond hair and first found in an individual from central Asia dated to around 15,000 BC, is found in three Eastern Hunter-Gatherers from Samara, Motala and Ukraine, and several later individuals with WSH ancestry. Geneticist David Reich concludes that the massive migration of Western Steppe Herders probably brought this mutation to Europe, explaining why there are hundreds of millions of copies of this SNP in modern Europeans. In 2020, a study suggested that ancestry from Western Steppe Pastoralists was responsible for lightening the skin and hair color of modern Europeans, having a dominant effect on the phenotype of Northern Europeans, in particular.

A study in 2015 found that Yamnaya had the highest ever calculated genetic selection for height of any of the ancient populations tested.

About a quarter of 5 ancient DNA samples from Yamnaya sites have an allele that is associated with lactase persistence, conferring lactose tolerance into adulthood. Steppe-derived populations such as the Yamnaya are thought to have brought this trait to Europe from the Eurasian steppe, and it is hypothesized that it may have given them a biological advantage over the European populations who lacked it.

Eurasian steppe populations display higher frequencies of the lactose tolerance allele than European farmers and hunter gatherers who lacked steppe admixture.

See also 
 Scandinavian Hunter-Gatherer

Notes

References

Bibliography 

 
 
 
 
 
 
 
 
 
 
 
 
 
 
 
 
 
 
 
 
 </ref>

Further reading 

 
 
 
 

WSH
Genetic history of Europe
Neolithic Europe
Bronze Age Europe
Modern human genetic history